Petri Kokko (born 21 February 1966) is a Finnish former competitive ice dancer. He competed with Susanna Rahkamo, his wife. With Rahkamo, he is the 1995 European champion, 1995 World silver medalist, and competed in the Winter Olympics twice.

Skating career 
Initially interested in hockey, Kokko began figure skating at age 14 to improve his skating skills. His first partner was Virpi Kunnas.

Rahkamo/Kokko formed their partnership in 1985 and moved to Oberstdorf, Germany to train with Martin Skotnický. Their first major international event was the 1986 European Championships, where they finished 18th. In 1990, they reached the top ten at the European and World Championships for the first time.

In the 1991–92 season, Rahkamo/Kokko won the silver medal at the 1991 Skate America and placed sixth at the 1992 Winter Olympics. The following season, they won gold at the 1992 Skate Canada International and bronze at the 1993 European Championships. They were fourth at the 1993 World Championships.

In 1993–94, Rahkamo/Kokko stood atop the podium at Piruetten. They placed fourth at the 1994 European Championships and at the 1994 Winter Olympics. They ended their season with a bronze medal at the 1994 World Championships.

At the 1995 European Championships, Rahkamo/Kokko became Finland's first European champions in figure skating — their country's next European title came in 2009 when Laura Lepistö won the ladies' singles event. They went on to win the silver medal at the 1995 World Championships. Their quickstep original dance from the 1994–95 season was adapted into a compulsory dance/pattern dance. It was ratified in June 2008 as the Finnstep.

Rahkamo/Kokko turned professional in 1995 and performed in ice shows until 2000. They made an appearance on Enigma's music video for Beyond the Invisible.

Later life 
Rahkamo and Kokko married in 1995 and have two children, Max born in 2001 and Camilla in 2003. Kokko has a master's degree from the Hanken School of Economics in Helsinki. He became the program manager at a sports television channel in 2001 and Nike Finland's managing director in 2003. He was appointed country manager for Google Finland in 2006, worked as global director of Google Inc. at Googleplex in California for two years from November 2009, and then became a director in Germany.

Programs 
(With Rahkamo)

Results

With Rahkamo

With Kunnas

References 

Living people
1966 births
Finnish male ice dancers
Olympic figure skaters of Finland
Figure skaters at the 1992 Winter Olympics
Figure skaters at the 1994 Winter Olympics
World Figure Skating Championships medalists
European Figure Skating Championships medalists
Google employees
Sportspeople from Helsinki
20th-century Finnish people